Bakata was the capital of the Ahom kingdom (present-day Assam, Northeast India) established by the Ahom king Suhungmung. Since this capital was by the Dihing river, Suhungmung is also known as the Dihingia Raja. The next king, Suklenmung, moved the capital to Garhgaon.

Notes

Capitals of Ahom kingdom
Ahom kingdom